Charles Saunders may refer to:
Charles Saunders (Royal Navy officer) (1713–1775), British admiral
Charles Saunders (colonial administrator) (1857–1931), British administrator
Charles Saunders (tennis) (1861–?), real tennis world champion, 1890–1895
Charles Saunders (director) (1904–1997), English film director and screenwriter
Charles Saunders (rower) (1902–1994), New Zealand rower
Charles E. Saunders (1867–1937), Canadian agronomist
Charles H. Saunders (1821–1901), City Councilor, Alderman and Mayor of Cambridge, Massachusetts
Charles R. Saunders (1946–2020), Canadian fantasy author
Charles Saunders (bishop) (1884–1973), Bishop of Lucknow, 1928–1938
Cathal Ó Sándair (1922–1996), prolific Irish language author.
 Charles Willard Saunders, American architect and partner at Saunders and Lawton